Paranormal Animals of North America is a supplement published by FASA in 1990 for the dystopian near-future role-playing game Shadowrun.

Contents
Paranormal Animals of North America, the first bestiary published for Shadowrun, is a supplement presenting "awakened animals", creatures that the innate magic of the land has altered into mythical forms.

Publication history
Paranormal Animals of North America is a 176-page softcover book written by Nigel D. Findley, with interior art by Jeff Laubenstein, Joel Biske, Dana Knutson, Todd M. Marsh, and James Nelson, and cover art by Nelson. It was published by FASA Corp. in 1990.

Reviews
White Wolf #22 (Aug./Sept., 1990)
Polyhedron #86

References

Role-playing game supplements introduced in 1990
Shadowrun supplements